A saddle tramp is a nomadic cowboy. The phrase may also refer to:

Saddle Tramp (album), a Charlie Daniels album and song
"Saddle Tramp", a song by Molly Hatchet in the album Silent Reign of Heroes
"Saddle Tramp", a song by Marty Robbins
"Saddle Tramp", a song by Travis Shredd and the Good Ol' Homeboys
"Saddle Tramp", a song by Dickless on the Sub Pop album The Grunge Years
Saddle Tramp (film), a 1950 western starring Joel McCrea
Saddle Tramp (comic strip), a short-lived photographic strip
"Saddle Tramp", a 1944 short story by Johnston McCulley
Saddle Tramps, a school spirit organization at Texas Tech University